The Equality Stakes was an American Thoroughbred horse race run annually from 1902 thru 1909 at Sheepshead Bay Race Track at Sheepshead Bay, New York. Open to horses age three and older, it was raced over a distance of one mile on dirt.

Historical notes
The inaugural running of the Equality Stakes produced a dead heat between Dublin and Highlander.

The three-year-old gelding Dolly Spanker won the 1904 edition of the Equality Stakes as part of a long and successful career winning on both dirt and turf. A popular runner, the New York Times called Dolly Spanker "one of the best-know flat racers in the country" and had been "one of the best handicap horses on the Metropolitan tracks."

The 1908 Equality stakes was won by James R. Keene's Ballot who would be named American Champion Older Male Horse for that year and again in 1910.

The End of a Race and of a Racetrack
Passage of the Hart–Agnew anti-betting legislation by the New York Legislature under Republican Governor Charles Evans Hughes led to a compete shutdown of racing in 1911 and 1912 in the state. A February 21, 1913 ruling by the New York Supreme Court, Appellate Division saw horse racing return in 1913. However, it was too late for the Sheepshead Bay horse racing facility and it never reopened.

Records
Speed record:
 1:38 flat @ 1 mile : Dolly Spanker (1904)

Most wins:
 2 – Hamburg Belle (1905, 1906)

Most wins by a jockey:
 No jockey ever won this race more than once.

Most wins by a trainer:
 2 – T. J. Healey (1902, 1904)
 2 – A. Jack Joyner (1905, 1906)

Most wins by an owner:
 2 – Richard T. Wilson Jr. (1902, 1904)
 2 – Sydney Paget (1905, 1906)

Winners

 * Dead heat for first in 1902.
 † 1907 raced in fog, no time taken.

References

Open mile category horse races
Discontinued horse races in New York City
Sheepshead Bay Race Track
Recurring sporting events established in 1902
Recurring sporting events disestablished in 1909